Lee Grinner Pace (born March 25, 1979) is an American actor. He is known for starring as Thranduil the Elvenking in The Hobbit trilogy and as Joe MacMillan in the AMC period drama television series Halt and Catch Fire. He has also appeared in the Marvel Cinematic Universe as Ronan the Accuser, a role he first played in Guardians of the Galaxy and reprised in Captain Marvel. Pace earned a 2008 Emmy nomination for his portrayal of Ned in the ABC comedy-drama Pushing Daisies. Since 2021, he stars as the galactic emperor Brother Day in the television series Foundation, based on the stories of Isaac Asimov.

Early life
Pace was born in Chickasha, Oklahoma, to Charlotte, a schoolteacher, and James, an engineer. He has a brother and a sister. As a child, Pace spent several years in Saudi Arabia, where his father worked in the oil business; the family later moved to Houston, Texas. He was raised Catholic.

Pace attended Klein High School in Spring, Texas, a suburb of Houston, with actor Matt Bomer. Pace briefly stopped attending high school to act at Houston's Alley Theatre before returning to graduate. At the Alley, he appeared in productions of The Spider's Web and The Greeks.

In 1997, he was accepted by the Juilliard School's Drama Division as a member of Group 30 (1997–2001), which also included actors Anthony Mackie and Tracie Thoms. While there, he was in several plays, including Romeo and Juliet as Romeo, Richard II in the title role, and Julius Caesar as Cassius. He graduated from Juilliard with a Bachelor of Fine Arts degree.

Career

Theater
After graduation, Pace starred in several off-Broadway plays, including The Credeaux Canvas and The Fourth Sister. He also starred in a production of Craig Lucas's Small Tragedy, for which he was nominated for a Lucille Lortel Award as Outstanding Actor. In 2006, Pace starred in the two-character play Guardians by Peter Morris, which earned Pace his second nomination for a Lortel Award as Outstanding Actor.

Pace made his Broadway debut in Larry Kramer's play The Normal Heart, portraying Bruce Niles. It opened at the Golden Theatre on April 27, 2011. The show ran for a total of 96 performances, with July 10 marking its final performance.

Pace was cast as composer Vincenzo Bellini in Golden Age, which began previews November 15, 2012. The play, written by Terrence McNally, began its official run at the Manhattan Theatre Club December 4, 2012. The previews were originally scheduled for November 13, 2012, but two shows were cancelled as a result of Hurricane Sandy.

Pace played the role of Joe Pitt in the Broadway revival of the National Theatre's production of Angels in America: A Gay Fantasia on National Themes. Previews began at the Neil Simon Theatre on February 23, 2018, and the show opened on March 25, 2018.

Film

Pace first gained recognition for his role in the 2003 film Soldier’s Girl, based on real events, in which he played the central role of Calpernia Addams.
Of the role, Pace has said: 

Pace won a Gotham Independent Film Award for Breakthrough Actor and was nominated for several other awards, including a Golden Globe Award, for his work in this film.

In 2006, Pace starred in Tarsem Singh’s The Fall. Upon release, The Fall was received with mixed reviews among critics and was a box office failure. However, it was one of his most artistic roles. His next film was Miss Pettigrew Lives for a Day. Pace was also featured in Possession with Sarah Michelle Gellar. Pace also played supporting roles in The White Countess, Infamous, When in Rome and The Good Shepherd. In 2010, Pace appeared as Phil Winslow in the film Marmaduke.

In 2012, Pace starred as Garrett, the nomadic vampire, in The Twilight Saga: Breaking Dawn – Part 2. Pace was admittedly aware of the reputation linked to the Twilight franchise, and revealed that he "went in to this a little like ‘You know what you’re getting into, just do what you can.’ " However, he enjoyed the experience and only had praise for the director Bill Condon. Stephenie Meyer, the author of the Twilight saga, was very satisfied with Pace’s performance as Garrett, since he "stood out as someone who really was just so much fun and really looked the part." The movie was met with a mixed reception by critics. However, some critics, such as Betsy Sharkey of the Los Angeles Times, whose only issue was that he was introduced too late in the series: "Why, oh, why didn’t they introduce him sooner?" Meanwhile, Sara Stewart of the New York Post simply described him as a “standout”.

On April 30, 2011, it was announced that Pace had been cast as the king of the Mirkwood Elves, Thranduil, in Peter Jackson's film adaptation of J. R. R. Tolkien's The Hobbit. The announcement was made by Peter Jackson himself, who revealed on his Facebook page that Pace had been his favorite for the part, ever since he saw his performance in The Fall. The character had previously been mentioned in Jackson's The Lord of the Rings: The Fellowship of the Ring, and had previously been portrayed in The Hobbit, voiced by Oscar-nominated director Otto Preminger, and in the 1968 BBC radio series, voiced by the British actor Leonard Fenton. Pace made three trips to New Zealand, and called it a “fantastic experience”. The character appeared in the prologue of The Hobbit: An Unexpected Journey released in December 2012, and had a larger role in The Hobbit: The Desolation of Smaug released in December 2013 and in the last film of the series, The Hobbit: The Battle of the Five Armies, released on December 17, 2014.

On July 28, 2011, it was announced that Pace had been cast in Steven Spielberg's Lincoln, as the one-time New York City mayor Fernando Wood, an early Confederate supporter. The events in the film take place in 1865, when Fernando Wood served in the House of Representatives. However, at the time, Wood was 53 years old, which is 20 years senior to Pace’s age when he portrayed him. In a Q&A, Spielberg revealed that he decided to offer Pace the part, after he saw his performance in Ceremony. Of the experience of the film, Pace said that “it was a real pinnacle of what I’ve done as an actor.” The movie was nominated for 12 Academy Awards, including Best Picture, and was nominated for Best Ensemble at the Screen Actors Guild Award. However, Pace was not included among the Lincoln ensemble’s nomination, and several bloggers were annoyed by this, including Katey Rich of Cinemablend.com and Nathaniel Rogers of The Film Experience.

Pace played the villain, Ronan the Accuser, in the 2014 Marvel Studios film Guardians of the Galaxy. He reprised the character in Captain Marvel.

Television
Pace played Aaron Tyler in the acclaimed but short-lived 2004 television series Wonderfalls, which was co-created by Bryan Fuller. Later, Fuller cast Pace in the lead role of Ned in the series Pushing Daisies which debuted on ABC in October 2007 and returned for its second and final season on October 1, 2008. He received a Primetime Emmy Award nomination for Outstanding Lead Actor in a Comedy Series for his performance.

Pace has also portrayed a child molester in the Law & Order: Special Victims Unit episode "Guilt". In 2010, he was cast in the unsold HBO pilot The Miraculous Year directed by Kathryn Bigelow. From 2014 to 2017, he played the role of Joe MacMillan in the AMC series Halt and Catch Fire.

In 2018, Pace was cast as Sam Colin in Hong Kong action crime television series Flying Tiger 2 produced by Shaw Brothers Studios.

In 2019, Apple announced that Pace had joined the cast of its adaptation of Isaac Asimov's Foundation, which premiered in September 2021, playing the role of Brother Day, the Galactic Empire's current Emperor.

Pace was the narrator of the horror podcast entitled Darkest Night, which was produced by the Paragon Collective and AMC's streaming service Shudder.

Personal life
Pace's sexual orientation became a topic of public discussion after he was accidentally outed as queer by Ian McKellen, who worked with him in The Hobbit films, in 2012. McKellen's "outing" was described in the press as a blunder and an accident on his part, as Pace had never addressed the subject. In an interview with W in February 2018, Pace mentioned having dated both men and women,and in June 2018, he spoke about being a queer actor in an interview with The New York Times. He is married to Matthew Foley, an executive at Thom Browne.

Filmography

Film

Television

Awards and nominations

References

External links

 
 
 
 

1970s births
Living people
21st-century American male actors
American LGBT actors
American male film actors
American male stage actors
American male Shakespearean actors
American male television actors
Juilliard School alumni
Klein High School alumni
LGBT people from Oklahoma
Male actors from Oklahoma
Male actors from Texas
People from Chickasha, Oklahoma
People from Houston
Queer men